Russell County is a county located in the U.S. Commonwealth of Kentucky. As of the 2020 census, the population was 17,991.  Its county seat is Jamestown. The county was formed on December 14, 1825, from portions of Adair, Cumberland and Wayne Counties and is named for William Russell.

In 2015, the cities of Jamestown and Russell Springs became two of the first gigabit Internet communities in Kentucky with the completion of a state-of-the-art optical fiber network by the local telephone cooperative.

Wolf Creek Dam is located in southern Russell County. The dam impounds Cumberland River to form Lake Cumberland, a major tourism attraction for the county. Wolf Creek National Fish Hatchery is also located in Russell County just below the dam.

Until relatively recently Russell County was a dry county, meaning that the sale of alcohol was prohibited. It voted to go "wet" in a referendum held on January 19, 2016, by a margin of 3,833 to 3,423 votes.

Geography
The highest point is  atop Dickerson Ridge in the extreme northern part of the county and the lowest point is  along the Cumberland River.

Major highways
 Cumberland Parkway
 U.S. Route 127 in Kentucky
 Kentucky Route 80

Adjacent counties
 Casey County  (north/EST Border)
 Pulaski County  (northeast/EST Border)
 Wayne County  (southeast/EST Border)
 Clinton County  (south)
 Cumberland County  (southwest)
 Adair County  (west)

Demographics

As of the census of 2000, there were 16,315 people, 6,941 households, and 4,796 families residing in the county. The racial makeup of the county was 98.34% White, 0.58% Black or African American, 0.12% Native American, 0.14% Asian, 0.02% Pacific Islander, 0.21% from other races, and 0.59% from two or more races.  0.86% of the population were Hispanic or Latino of any race.

There were 6,941 households, out of which 29.00% had children under the age of 18 living with them, 55.30% were married couples living together, 10.20% had a female householder with no husband present, and 30.90% were non-families. 28.00% of all households were made up of individuals, and 12.90% had someone living alone who was 65 years of age or older.  The average household size was 2.33 and the average family size was 2.82.

In the county, the population was spread out, with 22.50% under the age of 18, 7.50% from 18 to 24, 27.50% from 25 to 44, 25.90% from 45 to 64, and 16.50% who were 65 years of age or older.  The median age was 40 years. For every 100 females there were 93.90 males.  For every 100 females age 18 and over, there were 91.00 males.

The median income for a household in the county was $22,042, and the median income for a family was $27,803. Males had a median income of $24,193 versus $18,289 for females. The per capita income for the county was $13,183.  About 20.40% of families and 24.30% of the population were below the poverty line, including 30.80% of those under age 18 and 27.30% of those age 65 or over.

Politics
Russell County is part of the historically and currently rock-ribbed Republican bloc of southeastern Kentucky that also includes such counties as Clinton, Cumberland, Casey, Pulaski, Laurel, Rockcastle, Monroe, McCreary, Clay, Jackson, Owsley and Leslie. These counties were opposed to secession during the Civil War era, and consequently became and have remained intensely Republican ever since. The last Democrat to win Russell County was Grover Cleveland in 1884, and the last Republican to not gain a majority was William Howard Taft in 1912 when his party was divided.

Communities

Cities
 Jamestown (county seat)
 Russell Springs

Unincorporated communities
 Bryan
 Crocus (partially in Adair County)
 Eli
 Esto
 Fonthill

Ghost Town
 Creelsboro

Notable people

 Tara Conner, Miss Kentucky USA 2006, Miss USA 2006
 Vernie McGaha, Former Kentucky State Senator
 Doug Moseley, later a Kentucky state senator, was pastor of the Russell Springs First United Methodist Church from 1958 to 1960
 Steve Wariner, country music singer and songwriter. Kentucky State Route 80 is named in his honor.
 Jeff Hoover,  Republican member of the Kentucky House of Representatives, elected Speaker in late 2016.

See also

 National Register of Historic Places listings in Russell County, Kentucky

References

External links
 Russell County Industrial Development Authority
 The Kentucky Highlands Project
 Russell County Public Library

 
Kentucky counties
1825 establishments in Kentucky
Populated places established in 1825
Counties of Appalachia